The  Medal for the Military Protection of the Territory  is a French state decoration established on 13 July 2015 by presidential decree 2015-853 and awarded to military personnel of the French Armed Forces for service during national security operations on French national territory.  It was created to recognize service following the need for an increased military presence during national security operations following the rise of international terrorism and the many incidents in France over the past years.

Award statute
The Medal for the Military Protection of the Territory is awarded to military personnel for their effective participation in military security operations as decided by the Government and carried out on the national territory.  The Minister of Defense is responsible for the administration of the medal and will determine by decree:
 the operations giving the right to the award of the medal and its related clasp;
 the dates during the same operations that give the right to the award of the medal and its related clasp;
 the minimum number of days served during the same operations giving the right to the award of the medal and its related clasp.
In exceptional circumstances, the Minister of Defense may, without any condition of duration of service, award the medal and its related clasp to soldiers killed or wounded during one of these operations, or cited for exceptional merit in conjunction with the award of the gold grade of the National Defence Medal earned for service related to one of these operations.

Clasps
The medal is always awarded with a clasp and multiple clasps may be worn simultaneously.  Five clasps are currently approved for wear on the ribbon of the Medal for the Military Protection of the Territory:

CYBER for thirty months of service in units whose main mission is related to national cyber defence, namely anticipation, surveillance, detection and response to computer and information attacks in the field of defence, on national territory. It may also be awarded for sixty days of effective participation in the missions described above.
 SENTINELLE  for participation in Opération Sentinelle for a minimum time period of sixty days total service (continuous or not) between 7 January 2015 to a date not yet specified.
 HARPIE  for effective participation in the "Harpie" mission for a minimum time period of thirty days total service (continuous or not)  on the territory of the department and overseas region of French Guiana between 1 March 2008 to a date not yet specified.
 TRIDENT for effective participation in military surveillance and protection missions of French airspace, waters and land areas between 1 July 2013 to a date not yet specified.  The time requirement for award of this clasp is 30 months total service for members of units whose primary mission was and remains the same as the award prerequisites, to military personnel not part of such units for 60 days total service (continuous or not)  or if in the case of surveillance flights, twenty such flights.
 JUPITER for effective participation in military surveillance and protection missions by strategic forces between 1 July 2013 to a date not yet specified.  The time requirement for award of this clasp is 30 months total service for members of units whose primary mission was and remains the same as the award prerequisites, to military personnel not part of such units for 60 days total service (continuous or not)  or if in the case of surveillance flights, twenty such flights.
 ÉGIDE for effective participation in the military protection of military assets, public and state buildings, of international organisations and diplomatic and consular missions between 1 July 2013 to a date not yet specified.  The time requirement for award of this clasp is 30 months total service for members of units whose primary mission was and remains the same as the award prerequisites, to military personnel not part of such units for 60 days total service (continuous or not)  or if in the case of surveillance flights, twenty such flights.

Award description
The Medal for the Military Protection of the Territory is a 30 mm in diameter circular medal struck from bronze.  Its obverse bears the effigy of the Republic with the relief inscription above "RÉPUBLIQUE" and below "FRANÇAISE".  The reverse bears the relief inscription on five lines "MÉDAILLE" "DE LA" "PROTECTION MILITAIRE" "DU" "TERRITOIRE".

The medal hangs from a 38 mm wide silk moiré ribbon passing through a ring through the medal's ball shaped suspension loop. The ribbon bears the national colours of France in the following pattern: 14 mm wide blue vertical central stripe bordered by white 8 mm wide stripes with 5 mm wide red edge stripes.

See also

 National Medal of Recognition for victims of terrorism
Charlie Hebdo shooting
November 2015 Paris attacks
2016 Nice truck attack
List of terrorist incidents in France

References

External links
Museum of the Legion of Honour (in French)

French campaign medals
Awards established in 2015
2015 establishments in France
Terrorism in France